Egil Selvik (born 30 July 1997) is a Norwegian professional soccer player who plays as a goalkeeper for Haugesund.

References

External links

1997 births
Living people
People from Sandnes
Norwegian footballers
Association football goalkeepers
Sandnes Ulf players
Nest-Sotra Fotball players
Odds BK players
FK Haugesund players
Norwegian First Division players
Eliteserien players
Sportspeople from Rogaland